Mikołaj "Bearpaw" Potocki (1595 – 20 November 1651) was a Polish nobleman, magnate and Field Crown Hetman of the Polish–Lithuanian Commonwealth from 1637 to 1646, Grand Hetman of the Crown from 1646 to 1651, governor of Bracław Voivodeship from 1636 and from 1646 Castellan of Kraków.

He was captured during the battle of Cecora by the Turks. In 1633 during the Battle of Paniowce, along with Prince Jeremi Wiśniowiecki and Stanisław Koniecpolski he defeated the Turk forces under Abaza Pasha.

In the 1637 Pavlyuk Uprising he defeated Cossacks under Pavlo Pavliuk at the battle of Kumejki. In the 1638 Ostryanyn Uprising he forced Dmytro Hunia to surrender. After those victories over the Cossacks he received large estates in Ukraine (Kresy).

The 1637–38 Cossack rebellions suppressed by Potocki were minutely described by historian and bishop Szymon Okolski who witnessed and directly participated in the developments of those days. His field diaries became a valuable information source for historians.

During the Sejm of 1646 Potocki opposed the plan of the king Władysław IV Vasa to wage war against the Turks.

He was known as very oppressive to peasantry and Cossacks. His behavior was one of the causes of the Khmelnytsky Uprising. In 1648 he disregarded the monarch's orders and attacked rebellious Cossacks in Ukraine. He was defeated at the Battle of Korsuń and captured by Tatars. In April 1650 he was released from jasyr. On 28–30 June 1651 he was victorious over Tatar and Cossack forces at the Battle of Beresteczko.

On 18 September 1651, after the indecisive Battle of Bila Tserkva he negotiated a treaty with the Cossacks.

Personal life 
Potocki had two wives, Zofia Firlej and Elżbieta Kazanowska. He had six children with Firlej: Piotr Potocki, Stefan Potocki, Mikołaj Potocki, Marianna Potocka, Wiktoria Potocka and Henryk Potocki. With Kazanowska he had three children: Jakub Potocki, Joanna Potocka and Dominik Potocki.

References 

 Hetmani Rzeczypospolitej Obojga Narodów; Bellona, Warsaw, 1994 

Field Crown Hetmans
Great Crown Hetmans
1595 births
1651 deaths
Mikolaj
Polish people of the Polish–Muscovite War (1605–1618)
Polish military personnel of the Khmelnytsky Uprising